"LaSalle Trail" is also the name of a municipal trail network in LaSalle, Ontario, Canada.

The LaSalle Trail is a rail trail in Indiana.

Occupying an abandoned railroad corridor, it is a  bicycle and walking trail.

It is currently open from Cripe St. to Cleveland Road in Roseland, Indiana.  When completed it will connect at the Indiana/Michigan state line to the Blossomland River Trail (proposed) in Michigan,
which will collectively be called the Indiana-Michigan River Valley Trail.

See also
 List of rail trails

References

External links
 Friends of the Trails

Rail trails in Indiana
Protected areas of St. Joseph County, Indiana
Transportation in St. Joseph County, Indiana